This is a list of notable Azerbaijani Turkish people which refers to people of full or partial Azerbaijani descent living in the Republic of Turkey.

List

References 

Azerbaijani
Turkish
Azerbaijani